"Mr. Roboto" is a song by American rock band Styx, released as the lead single from their eleventh studio album, Kilroy Was Here (1983). It was written by band member Dennis DeYoung. In Canada, it went to #1 on the RPM national singles chart. In the U.S., it reached #3 on the Billboard Hot 100 in April 1983.

Description and background
The Japanese lyrics at the beginning of the song are as follows:

どうもありがとうミスターロボット (Dōmo arigatō misutā robotto)
また会う日まで (Mata au hi made)
どうもありがとうミスターロボット (Dōmo arigatō misutā robotto)
秘密を知りたい (Himitsu o shiritai)

The lyrics translate into English as follows:

Thank you very much, Mr. Roboto
Until the day we meet again
Thank you very much, Mr. Roboto
I want to know your secret

The lyric "Dōmo arigatō, Mr. Roboto" has entered popular culture as a catchphrase, appearing in media such as The Simpsons, Futurama, Archer, My Life as a Teenage Robot, Arrested Development,  Eight Crazy Nights, Austin Powers in Goldmember, DodgeBall: A True Underdog Story, Man With A Plan, The Perfect Man, Chuck, Ion Fury, Mr. Robot, iCarly, King of Queens, and How I Met Your Mother.

The song tells part of the story of Robert Orin Charles Kilroy (ROCK), in the rock opera Kilroy Was Here. The song is performed by Kilroy (as played by keyboardist Dennis DeYoung), a rock and roll performer who was placed in a futuristic prison for "rock and roll misfits" by the anti-rock-and-roll group the Majority for Musical Morality (MMM) and its founder Dr. Everett Righteous (played by guitarist James Young). The Roboto is a model of robot which does menial jobs in the prison. Kilroy escapes the prison by overpowering a Roboto prison guard and hiding inside its emptied-out metal shell. When Jonathan Chance (played by guitarist Tommy Shaw) finally meets Kilroy at the very end of the song, Kilroy unmasks and yells "I'm Kilroy! Kilroy!", ending the song.

The robot-like catchphrase was created with a vocoder.

Stan Winston, who would become well-known through his work on The Terminator, Aliens and Jurassic Park, designed the Roboto costume and mask, which are displayed prominently on the cover of the album Kilroy Was Here. The song's writer Dennis DeYoung did not think of the song as a single until his wife Suzanne, Dennis's friend Dave, and the staff at A&M suggested it as a good candidate. The track was released as the first single from the album at the last minute instead of "Don't Let It End" and turned out to be the band's last Top 5 US hit for eight years. As a result of this song, the Japanese phrase "domo arigato" entered popular American vernacular. In addition, many have cited this song and the album as potentially having alienated older fans, some calling it "jumping the shark" for the band. Though the song and album may not have resonated with older fans at the time, it remained relevant for younger generations, and James Young has said that due to the song, "we're a part of pop culture."

"Mr. Roboto" has been described as synthpop.

Reception
Cash Box reviewed the single, saying that "the group sings of the struggles of a creature with a human heart and an IBM brain. They communicate their message through such devices as a voice box intro and high tech, synth effects."  Billboard called it "a mesh of bouncy melody, electronically distorted vocals and a refrain in Japanese," saying that "the group bemoans the plight of 'modern man' oppressed by technology."

Personnel
 Dennis DeYoung - lead vocals, keyboards, synthesizer
 Tommy Shaw - guitar, backing vocals, vocoder
 James Young - guitar, backing vocals, vocoder 
 Chuck Panozzo - bass guitar
 John Panozzo - drums

Music video
The song's video, directed by Brian Gibson, depicts Jonathan Chance (played by guitarist Tommy Shaw) walking into the Rock Museum to meet Kilroy, and a robot approaches. After this, it morphs into five robots moving and dancing (choreographed by Kenny Ortega). Shortly thereafter, the robots transform into the members of Styx, including a clean-shaven Dennis DeYoung (he shaved his trademark moustache off at the conclusion of the Paradise Theater tour in 1982). The video then alternates between the band playing the song on a stage and scenes from the Kilroy Was Here backdrop film. Then, the members of Styx morph back into the robots and DeYoung confronts the robots, screaming in the ear of one of the robots before collapsing. DeYoung awakens to see he is being experimented on and runs off. The video cuts back to the ending of the first scene and Jonathan Chance climbs on to the stage. Before the robot removes his mask to reveal Kilroy, another shot of the robot with lights on is used to end the clip.

Playing Mr. Roboto in the video was mime Robert Griffard.

Single release

The song was released as a 45 RPM single in a 4:48 single edit, which has the synthesizer intro and a bar at the finale removed (available on Greatest Hits released by PolyTel in Canada in 1992), with the song "Snowblind" (from their previous album Paradise Theatre) as the B-side.

Charts

Weekly charts

Year-end chart

Certifications

References

External links
StyxCollector.com: Center For Roboto Research And Preservation 

1983 singles
1983 songs
Styx (band) songs
Cashbox number-one singles
Oricon International Singles Chart number-one singles
RPM Top Singles number-one singles
Songs written by Dennis DeYoung
A&M Records singles
Songs about robots
Songs about fictional male characters
Japan in non-Japanese culture